The Tuscan regional election of 1990 took place on 6 and 7 May 1990.

Electoral law 
Election was held under proportional representation with provincial constituencies where the largest remainder method with a Droop quota was used. To ensure more proportionality, remained votes and seats were transferred at regional level and calculated at-large.

Results
The Italian Communist Party was by far the largest party, but lost many votes from five years before. After the election Communist Marco Marcucci formed a government comprising the Italian Socialist Party and the Italian Democratic Socialist Party. In 1992 Vannino Chiti took over from Marcucci and the centre-right Italian Liberal Party joined the government.

Source: Ministry of the Interior

References

1990 elections in Italy
1990 regional election
1990
May 1990 events in Europe